Robert Grasso is an Australian, Sydney-based Media professional with over 25 years experience in public relations and journalism.

He was previously a Senior Lineup Producer with 7 Weekend Sunrise and the Sports Editor/Supervising Producer (Sport) with SBS Television. He also serves as a sports anchor for the network's flagship program, SBS World News.

Grasso is one of SBS' longest-serving members, having worked on location at some of the station's biggest sporting events including the 2018 FIFA World Cup (Russia), 2014 FIFA World Cup (Brazil), and the 1998 FIFA World Cup (France). He has covered international track & field on location, including the 2001 (Canada) and 2003 (France) IAAF World Indoor Championships in Athletics. He has reported on Davis Cup tennis around Australia and covered the Australia national soccer team World Cup qualifying campaigns in the Middle East.

Career
With a degree in Commerce (Marketing), he began his career as a publicist for SBS TV promoting News, Current Affairs and Sport.

After attending the Australian Film, Television and Radio School and Max Rowley Media Academy, Grasso embarked on a career in radio.  His big break in television came in 1996, working as a weekend reporter on SBS TV's nightly sports show, Toyota World Sports.

Grasso has covered many sports, including tennis, association football, athletics (both domestically and internationally), winning an Athletics Australia media award for television news coverage in 2002.

References

External links
 Robert Grasso's blog at sbs.com.au
 Facebook page

Australian sports broadcasters
Living people
Tennis commentators
Year of birth missing (living people)